Waipu District is a rural district in Taichung City, Taiwan. It has a population total of 31,186 and an area of 42.4099 square kilometres.

Administrative divisions 
Yongfeng, Liufen, Datong, Datung, Sankan, Shuimei, Tieshan, Zhongshan, Maming, Tucheng and Buzi Village.

Transportation 
Taiwan High Speed Rail passes through the central part of the district, but no station is currently planned.

See also 
 Taichung

References

External links 

  

Districts of Taichung